Daniel Heuer Fernandes (born 13 November 1992) is a professional footballer who plays a goalkeeper for 2. Bundesliga club Hamburger SV. Born in Germany, he has represented Portugal at youth level.

Early life 
Daniel Heuer Fernandes was born in Bochum to a Portuguese father and a German mother. He grew up in the Bochum-quarter of Langendreer and has both German and Portuguese citizenship.

Club career

Early years
Heuer Fernandes' youth career included stints at VfL Bochum and Borussia Dortmund. He played for VfL Bochum II for two seasons. During the 2011–12 season, he made 14 appearances and during the 2012–13 season, he made 34 appearances.

From 3. Liga to Bundesliga
He played for VfL Osnabrück during the 2013–14 and 2014–15 seasons. During the 2013–14 season, he made 36 appearances. During the 2014–15 season, he made 26 appearances.

In July 2015, Heuer Fernandes left 3. Liga side VfL Osnabrück to join freshly relegated and then 2. Bundesliga club SC Paderborn. He signed a two-year contract until 2017. He played in matchday 22 to matchday 34 for a total of 13 matches.

He moved to SV Darmstadt 98 in July 2016. During the 2016–17 season, he made seven appearances. During the 2017–18 season, he made 29 appearances.

Hamburger SV
For the 2019–20 season, Heuer Fernandes moved to league competitor Hamburger SV for €1.3 million, with whom he received a contract that ran until 30 June 2022. At HSV he beat out Julian Pollersbeck to become the starting goalkeeper as part of the preparation for the season. Heuer Fernandes was rarely able to convince, however. Sports magazine kicker even wrote after the 2–3 loss in the top match against to VfB Stuttgart on 28 May 2020: "Obviously, even with the clumsy penalty committed by Daniel Heuer Fernandes in Stuttgart, it became clear that HSV had no support in goal." Up to this point, Heuer Fernandes had played 30 competitive games for HSV and had to concede 37 goals; only in 7 games had he not conceded a goal. For the next match on 31 May, Pollersbeck returned in the HSV goal, while Tom Mickel remained the backup and Heuer Fernandes was not considered for the matchday squad for the first time since his move. From matchday 30, Heuer Fernandes was given Mickel's spot as the backup. Without Fernandes in goal, HSV failed to get promoted and finished 4th in the league table at the end of the season.

Daniel Thioune took over as head coach of the team for the 2020–21 season. Under him, Heuer Fernandes was initially the starting goalkeeper again, after which Pollersbeck moved to French Ligue 1 club Lyon. The German-Portuguese keeper was the starter in the 4–1 loss in the DFB-Pokal against 3. Liga team Dynamo Dresden and in the two opening wins in the league before Mickel took over in goal. HSV then signed another goalkeeper, Sven Ulreich, who had been Manuel Neuer's backup at Bayern Munich for the past 5 years, whereupon Heuer Fernandes once again became the backup in the HSV goal.

International career
On 15 October 2012, Heuer Fernandes made his first appearance for the Portuguese national under-21 team in a friendly against Ukraine. He was a part of the squad of the Portuguese under 21 team for the 2015 UEFA European Under-21 Championship in Czech Republic, where the Lusitanians reached the final, where the team lost against Sweden after the penalty shoot out.

Career statistics

References

External links
 
 

1992 births
Living people
Citizens of Portugal through descent
Portuguese footballers
Portugal under-21 international footballers
German footballers
German people of Portuguese descent
Sportspeople from Bochum
Association football goalkeepers
3. Liga players
2. Bundesliga players
Bundesliga players
VfL Bochum players
VfL Bochum II players
VfL Osnabrück players
SC Paderborn 07 players
SV Darmstadt 98 players
Hamburger SV players
Footballers from North Rhine-Westphalia